Gil Shwed (Hebrew: גיל שויד; born 1968) is an Israeli software engineer and entrepreneur. He is the co-founder and CEO of Check Point Software Technologies Ltd, one of Israel's largest technology companies and the world's largest pure-play cybersecurity company.

Biography
Shwed was born in Jerusalem. He started programming at the age of 13, and two years later began studying computer sciences at Hebrew University in Jerusalem, while he was still in high-school.

During his military service he was part of the Intelligence Corps' Unit 8200. After his military service had ended, Shwed joined the Israeli startup company Optrotech (currently Orbotech), where he worked as a Software Developer.

In 1993, Shwed founded Check Point with Shlomo Kramer, Shwed's friend from the military unit, and Marius Nacht with whom he worked at Optrotech.

That year, Shwed invented and patented stateful inspection, which served as the basis for the first version of the company's renowned FireWall-1, released in 1994. Stateful Inspection is still widely used in network firewalls today.

Shwed is the chief executive officer and director of Check Point. He previously served as president of Check Point and chairman of the board. As of 2018, Shwed is the leading shareholder in Checkpoint, owning 19.1% of the company, with an estimated worth of US$3.4 billion. The second largest shareholder in Check Point is US investment company Massachusetts Financial Services Company with a 7.7% stake worth $1.3 billion at present.

Shwed and Check Point emphasize the "fifth generation" of cybersecurity, addressing the underlying issues behind such vulnerabilities as the WannaCry and NotPetya security breaches in 2017. He has stated that enterprise businesses are "two generations behind" in their security thinking, and describes the industry as being at an "inflection point."

He is currently a member of the Board of Trustees of Tel Aviv University and the Chairman of the Board of Trustees of the Youth University of Tel Aviv University. He is also a member of the Board of Directors of Yeholot Association Founded by the Rashi Foundation whose charter is, among other things, to reduce dropout rates in high schools.

On 5 March 2021, Forbes listed his net worth at US$2.9 billion.

Acknowledgments
In 2002, Shwed appeared on the front cover of Forbes’ Billionaires issue.

He received an honorary Doctor of Science from the Technion – Israel Institute of Technology, which he received in June 2005.

He was acknowledged by the World Economic Forum's Global Leader for Tomorrow as one of the world's 100 top young leaders, due to his commitment to public affairs and leadership in areas beyond immediate professional interests. In addition, in 2002, Shwed received the Academy of Achievement's Golden Plate Award at a ceremony in Dublin, Ireland, for his innovative contribution to business and technology.

Shwed received the Israel-America Chambers of Commerce Industry Award on behalf of Check Point Software Technologies, for companies who demonstrate entrepreneurial abilities and excellence in the field of advanced technologies.

In 2010, Shwed was recognized as the Ernst & Young Entrepreneur of the Year in Israel.

Globes honored Shwed as their "Person of the Year" in 2014. In September 2017, Shwed was ranked 12th in TheMarker Magazine list.

In 2018, Shwed was the recipient of the first-ever Israel Prize in technology.

References

External links
 Gil Shwed's biography at Check Point Home Page
 Shwed’s profile on Forbes
 Shwed’s profile on Bloomberg Businessweek
 Masters of The Universe 14 Years Later

1968 births
Living people
Businesspeople in software
Israeli billionaires
Israeli computer programmers
Israeli chief executives
21st-century Israeli inventors
People from Jerusalem
Technology company founders
Tel Aviv University people
Israeli company founders